Dichilus is a genus of flowering plants in the family Fabaceae. It belongs to the subfamily Faboideae.

Species
Dichilus comprises the following species:
 Dichilus gracilis Eckl. & Zeyh.
 Dichilus lebeckioides DC.

 Dichilus pilosus Schinz
 Dichilus reflexus (N.E. Br.) A.L. Schutte
 Dichilus strictus E. Mey.

Species names with uncertain taxonomic status
The status of the following species is unresolved:
 Dichilus candicans E.Mey.
 Dichilus ciliatus A.Spreng.
 Dichilus dallonianus Maire
 Dichilus floribundus Sond.
 Dichilus hypotrichum Spreng.
 Dichilus microphyllus E.Mey.
 Dichilus patens E.Mey.
 Dichilus pusillus (E.Mey.) Benth.
 Dichilus sericeus A.Spreng.
 Dichilus spicatus E.Mey.

References

Genisteae
Fabaceae genera